Isocarpha oppositifolia, the Rio Grande pearlhead, is a New World species of plants in the family Asteraceae. It is widely distributed in eastern and southern Mexico, Central America, the West Indies (Cuba, Jamaica, Bahamas, Caymans, Trinidad), and northern South America (Colombia, Venezuela). The range extends northward, just barely crossing to the north side of the Río Grande in the two southernmost counties in Texas (Cameron + Hidalgo).

One plant produces several flower heads, each a long flower stalk, each head with 60-150 disc flowers but no ray flowers.

References

External links
Conabio, ficha informativa, Isocarpha oppositifolia (L.) Cass. in Spanish with photos
Photo of herbarium specimen at Missouri Botanical Garden, collected in Guatemala in 2008

Eupatorieae
Flora of North America
Flora of South America
Flora of Central America
Plants described in 1759
Flora of the Caribbean
Flora without expected TNC conservation status